Jeremy Barrington Neumark Jones (born 1989 in Enfield) is an English actor who has taken lead roles on the BBC television series The Last Post (2017) and on the ITV drama series Belgravia (2020).

His grandparents were German Jews who moved to England because of the Nazi regime. In 2020, he took up German citizenship.

Career

Film

Television

References

External links
 
 

British male film actors
English male film actors
English male stage actors
English male television actors
Living people
1989 births
People from Enfield, London